General elections were held in the Ottoman Empire during the second half of 1877.

Background
General elections had been held earlier in 1877 after a new constitution was promulgated in December 1876. The new Parliament opened on 19 March 1877, with a planned lifetime of three months. With a ten-day extension agreed by Sultan Abdul Hamid II, it was dissolved on 28 June.

Article 119 of the constitution required a new electoral law to be in place by the time of the second elections. However, although it had been passed by the Chamber of Deputies, it was still under discussion by the Senate, and had not become law, so the election was held in accordance with the previous system. The Provisional Electoral Regulations issued on 29 October 1876 stated that the elected members of the Provincial Administrative Councils would elect MPs. Candidature was limited men above the age of 30 who was competent in Turkish and had full civil rights. Reasons for disqualification included holding dual citizenship, being employed by a foreign government, being bankrupt, employed as a servant or had "notoriety for ill deeds".

Aftermath
The newly elected Parliament first convened on 13 December 1877, but was prorogued by the Sultan on 14 February 1878 under the pretext of the war with Russia. It did not reconvene until 1908.

References

1877 elections in Asia
1877 elections in Europe
Elections in the Ottoman Empire
1877 in the Ottoman Empire